Hans Kampffmeyer may refer to:
 Hans Kampffmeyer (1876–1932), activist with Garden City Movement
 Hans Kampffmeyer (1912–1996), Social Democratic town planner